Taranidaphne hongkongensis is a species of sea snail, a marine gastropod mollusk in the family Raphitomidae.

Description
The length of the shell attains 6 mm, its diameter 3 mm.

Distribution
This marine species occurs in the Red Sea and off Hong Kong

References

 Jousseaume, F., 1895. Description d'un mollusque nouveau. Le Naturaliste 9(2): 147
 Morassi, M. & Bonfitto, A. (2001a) Taranidaphne dufresnei (Mollusca: Gastropoda: Turridae), new genus and species from Yemen, Red Sea. The Veliger, 44, 66–72

External links
  Sowerby, G.B., III. (1889a) Descriptions of fourteen new species of shells from China, Japan, and the Andaman Islands, chiefly collected by Deputy Surgeon-Gen. R. Hungerford. Proceedings of the Zoological Society of London, 1888, 565–570, pl. 28
 
 Gastropods.com: Taranidaphne hongkongensis
 MNHN, Paris : Taranidaphne hongkongensis

hongkongensis
Gastropods described in 1889